Selmir Miscic (born January 23, 2003) is an American soccer player who currently plays as a midfielder for MLS Next Pro club Portland Timbers 2.

Career
After spending over two years with the Philadelphia Union academy, Miscic signed a professional contract with Philadelphia's USL Championship side Philadelphia Union II on September 12, 2018. He made his professional debut on June 9, 2019, as an 86th-minute substitute during a 4–1 loss to Nashville SC.

In March 2021, Miscic was loaned to North Carolina FC in USL League One for the 2021 season.

Personal life
Miscic's parents emigrated to the United States from Bosnia and Herzegovina during the Bosnian War. His father was also a professional footballer in both Bosnia and Germany.

References

External links 
 

2003 births
Living people
American soccer players
Association football midfielders
Philadelphia Union II players
North Carolina FC players
Soccer players from Vermont
USL Championship players
Sportspeople from Burlington, Vermont
American people of Bosnia and Herzegovina descent
Portland Timbers 2 players
MLS Next Pro players